Mateja Kežman (born 12 April 1979) is a Serbian sports agent and former professional footballer who played as a striker.

Upon playing in his homeland, Kežman went on to play top-flight football in the Netherlands, England, Spain, Turkey, France, Russia, Hong Kong and Belarus. He is arguably best known for his career at PSV, earning numerous awards and worldwide recognition as having the potential to be one of the greatest strikers of his generation, being named Dutch Footballer of the Year in 2003. Kežman was subsequently labeled as a flop after his spell at Chelsea, as there were extremely high expectations of him. By the end of his illustrious career, he had amassed a record number of championship medals in the top-tier competitions of five different countries. Internationally, Kežman represented FR Yugoslavia / Serbia and Montenegro in one European Championship and one World Cup.

After finishing his professional playing career, Kežman became a sports agent, currently representing Sergej Milinković-Savić among other players. He also served as a director of football at Vojvodina in 2013.

Early and personal life
Kežman's father Zlatko was also a footballer who played as a goalkeeper, spending the majority of his career with Zemun.

His early career at Partizan was disrupted by NATO's airstrikes on Belgrade in 1999. In 2003, he took protection when a Yugoslav criminal threatened to kidnap him and hold PSV to ransom.

Kežman is a devout member of the Serbian Orthodox Church. During his time in the Netherlands, he prayed in the German city of Dortmund to retain his privacy. Although he considers his addiction to tattoos to be a vice, his tattoos are of a religious theme, and while playing he wore an undershirt with a printed icon of Jesus; this drew media attention during his spell in Turkey. He pledged to become a monk in the church.

Club career

Partizan
In the summer of 1998. At the age of 19, Kežman joined Partizan. In the 1998/99 season. He scored six goals in 22 championship matches, and won the championship title. In that season, he drew attention to himself when, in the 111-th Eternal derby against Red Star, he scored a goal in the last minute, which gave Partizan a 2–1 victory.

In the 1999/00 season. Coach Miodrag Ješić takes the helm on the Partizan bench and then Kežman plays even better games. He scored 27 goals in 32 league games. However, the black and white team ended that season without a trophy.
 
In his two seasons at the club, Kežman made a name for himself as a prolific striker and became a favourite among the fans of the club. He scored a total of 33 league goals in 54 appearances and was the top scorer of the national championship in the 1999–2000 season. He was especially good in the eternal derbies with Red Star, because he scored the same number of goals in 5 games he played.

PSV
In the summer of 2000, Kežman completed his move to Dutch club PSV. In his debut season, he was the league's top scorer, achieving 24 goals in 33 games as PSV won the title. He also picked up the nickname 'Batman', because the famous theme song was played at Philips Stadion every time he scored. He formed a successful partnership with Arjen Robben, and they gained the epithet 'Batman and Robben', a pun on Batman and Robin.

Kežman went to score 81 goals over the following three seasons with PSV. His best season in terms of both goals and appearances was 2002–03 when he played 33 out of 34 of PSV's matches and scored 35 goals to help them win the title.

Chelsea
Kežman spent the 2004–05 season at Chelsea and scored seven goals in 40 appearances in all competitions. He was signed for the club on 13 July 2004 for £5.3 million by José Mourinho. He wore the number 9 shirt left vacant by Jimmy Floyd Hasselbaink's transfer to Middlesbrough.

He played 24 league games and scored four goals. The first goal came on 4 December 2004 in a 4–0 victory over Newcastle United at home, with an injury time penalty after coming on as a substitute in the 61st minute. He did not score again until 11 March 2005 in a 3–1 away victory over Norwich City, who were relegated at the end of the season. Eight days later he scored twice at home against another team that would be relegated, Crystal Palace, as Chelsea won 4–1. At the end of the season Chelsea won their first league title since 1954–55.

His first ever goal for Chelsea was in League Cup third round at home to West Ham United on 27 October 2004. It was the only goal of the game. He scored a goal in extra time (112th minute) of the 2005 League Cup Final against Liverpool. Chelsea won 3–2 after it finished 1–1 after 90 minutes.

Kežman scored a goal in the 3rd round of that season's FA Cup against Scunthorpe United as Chelsea won 3–1 at home. His attack down the right wing set up Chelsea's first goal in the 4-2 win against Barcelona in the Champions League Round of 16, in a "brilliant" play with the scorer Eiður Guðjohnsen.

In 2011, Kežman revealed to Sky Sports that his time at Chelsea was the best he has ever had in football, despite failing to make an impact for the club: "Chelsea was the best thing in my career. That was the climax of my career, for sure. Living and playing in London was something that I will never forget. I don't know if I made a mistake because I moved away so quickly. Maybe I do and maybe I don't regret it, but I always believe in my decisions. But the transfer to Chelsea made my dreams come true. That was the best thing that ever happened to me. Maybe I could achieve more and I could have been more successful at Stamford Bridge, but I don't regret anything."

Atlético Madrid
Kežman left Chelsea for Atlético Madrid of Spain's Primera División on 29 June 2005 for £5.3 million, the same price as he had joined Chelsea. He soon suffered a knee injury, which he did not recover from until after New Year's in 2006. Initially, the appointment of José Murcia as coach allegedly boosted Kežman's confidence, but by the end of his spell in Madrid, Kežman actually scored more goals (six) under Carlos Bianchi than with Murcia (with whom he scored a total of two goals in the remainder of the season). Atlético ended the season in 10th and were knocked out by Real Zaragoza in the Copa del Rey round of 16. Kežman scored a total of eight goals in 30 league matches, often in a strike partnership with Fernando Torres.

Fenerbahçe

In the summer of 2006, Kežman was transferred to Fenerbahçe on a four-year contract. He played a central role in Fenerbahçe winning the 2006–07 Süper Lig in their centennial year. In the 2007–08 UEFA Champions League, he appeared in over half of Fenerbahçe's group stage matches against the likes of his former club PSV, Internazionale and CSKA Moscow. Ironically, he even played against Chelsea over both legs of the 2008 Champions League quarter-finals; the first of which he started and showed off with a close bicycle kick in a 2–1 win, while in the second leg he was subbed in during the dying minutes of his team's 2–0 loss at Stamford Bridge, where Fenerbahçe was eliminated in the longest-lasting Champions League campaign in the club's history. As a result of this and the preceding regular season, in which Kežman scored almost a goal every other game by statistical average, Fenerbahçe S.K. supporters revered him even in the years after he left Istanbul in his journeyman years.

Paris Saint-Germain
On 19 August 2008, Kežman signed for Paris Saint-Germain, a one-year loan with a buyout clause. He appeared in 21 league matches, mostly as substitute, and scored three goals.

On 30 August 2009, it was announced that Kežman would be joining Zenit Saint Petersburg from Paris Saint-Germain on a season-long loan, with a purchase option for an undisclosed fee. The next day, the transfer had been officially confirmed when the player passed medical examinations. He scored two goals for Zenit helping the team to finish 3rd in the Russian Premier League, but the Russian side decided not to retain his services, and he returned to Paris in January 2010.

On 3 November 2010, Kežman's contract with PSG was terminated by mutual consent.

South China
On 20 January 2011, it was announced that Kežman had signed to play for South China for the rest of the 2010–11 Hong Kong First Division League. Kežman made his debut on 29 January 2011 versus NT Realty Wofoo Tai Po which lost 1–0; he was substituted by Leung Chun Pong in the 64th minute.

On 13 February 2011, in the League Cup semi-final against league leader Kitchee, Kežman scored his first goal for the club in the 32nd minute and his second goal seven minutes before the end. South China beat Kitchee by 4–2 and entered the finals.

On 13 April 2011, in the 2011 AFC Cup group H match against Kingfisher East Bengal, Kežman scored his first AFC Cup goal in the 69th minute with a header, assisted by Au Yeung Yiu Chung. His goal helped South China gain victory and moved up to 3rd position in the group, but he also received a yellow card in the match, his second yellow card in the tournament and he missed the away game to East Bengal.

In May 2011, after his team failed to progress into the 2011 AFC Cup knockout stage, following 2–4 loss to Indonesian outfit Persipura Jayapura, Kežman said to the media that the AFC Cup is a strange competition and kind of stupid. He blamed the hot weather and long travel to go to Jayapura as one of the factors why his team could not progress further.

In the final match of the 2010–11 Hong Kong FA Cup, Kežman managed to take advantage of an opponent's defensive error and scored an outstanding goal in extra time to give his team a 2–1 win over NT Realty Wofoo Tai Po on 29 May 2011. The next day, Kežman finished his stint with South China after his four-month contract expired.

BATE
On 31 August 2011, Kežman joined Belarusian side BATE Borisov as a free agent until the end of the year. He was seen as a reinforcement for upcoming UEFA Champions League group stage games and as a potential replacement for seriously injured striker Vitali Rodionov. Ultimately, Kežman played six games in the Belarusian League and 5 games in the Champions League without scoring any goals. He parted ways with BATE after the last Champions League game against Barcelona.

Return to Hong Kong and retirement
In January 2012, Kežman returned to South China to play at the Asian Challenge Cup. He played his last professional match on 26 January 2012, missing the last penalty in the shoot-out series against Guangzhou R&F, in the third-place match.

International career
Kežman marked his senior international debut for FR Yugoslavia during March 2000 with a goal against China in a friendly match as part of the preparations for UEFA Euro 2000. Head coach Vujadin Boškov included him in the final 23-man roster that he took to Belgium and the Netherlands. Despite being the fourth attacking option behind Predrag Mijatović, Savo Milošević and Darko Kovačević, 21-year-old Kežman got his chance as substitute late in the group match versus Norway. However, after being on the pitch for about 90 seconds, he was sent off following a rash tackle on Erik Mykland.

In February 2003, after embarrassing performances of the team during UEFA Euro 2004 qualifying, Kežman announced that he retired from the national jersey. However, Kežman returned to the team few months later, after Ilija Petković was appointed as the new coach.

Kežman led Serbia and Montenegro's scoring during the 2006 FIFA World Cup qualifications with five goals, including the only goal in the final game against Bosnia and Herzegovina which in turn allowed Serbia and Montenegro to qualify directly, having come first in their group. During the competition, he was sent off in a group match against Argentina by referee Roberto Rosetti.

After his sending off against Argentina at the 2006 FIFA World Cup, Kežman did not receive any call up for his country's national team.

During his six-year career in the national team, Kežman scored 17 goals in 49 appearances.

Career statistics

Club

International

Scores and results list Serbia and Montenegro's goal tally first, score column indicates score after each Kežman goal.

Honours
Partizan
First League of FR Yugoslavia: 1998–99

PSV
Eredivisie: 2000–01, 2002–03
Johan Cruyff Shield: 2000, 2001, 2003

Chelsea
Premier League: 2004–05
Football League Cup: 2004–05

Fenerbahçe
Süper Lig: 2006–07
Turkish Super Cup: 2007

Paris Saint-Germain
Coupe de France: 2009–10

South China
Hong Kong FA Cup: 2010–11

BATE Borisov
 Belarusian Premier League: 2011

Individual
First League of FR Yugoslavia top scorer: 1999–2000
Eredivisie top scorer: 2000–01, 2002–03, 2003–04
Dutch Footballer of the Year: 2002–03
ESM Team of the Year: 2002–03

Notes

References

External links

 
 
 
 

2006 FIFA World Cup players
Association football forwards
Atlético Madrid footballers
Chelsea F.C. players
Eredivisie players
Expatriate footballers in Belarus
Expatriate footballers in France
Expatriate footballers in Hong Kong
Expatriate footballers in Russia
Expatriate footballers in Spain
Expatriate footballers in the Netherlands
Expatriate footballers in England
Expatriate footballers in Turkey
FC BATE Borisov players
FC Zenit Saint Petersburg players
Fenerbahçe S.K. footballers
FK Loznica players
FK Partizan players
FK Radnički Pirot players
FK Smederevo players
Hong Kong First Division League players
La Liga players
Ligue 1 players
Paris Saint-Germain F.C. players
Premier League players
PSV Eindhoven players
Russian Premier League players
Serbia and Montenegro expatriate footballers
Serbia and Montenegro footballers
Serbia and Montenegro expatriate sportspeople in Spain
Serbia and Montenegro expatriate sportspeople in the Netherlands
Serbia and Montenegro expatriate sportspeople in England
Serbia and Montenegro international footballers
Serbia and Montenegro under-21 international footballers
Serbian expatriate footballers
Serbian expatriate sportspeople in Belarus
Serbian expatriate sportspeople in France
Serbian expatriate sportspeople in Hong Kong
Serbian expatriate sportspeople in Russia
Serbian expatriate sportspeople in Turkey
Serbian footballers
Serbian sports agents
South China AA players
Footballers from Belgrade
Süper Lig players
UEFA Euro 2000 players
1979 births
Living people
Members of the Serbian Orthodox Church
Eastern Orthodox Christians from Serbia
Belarusian Premier League players